The Mulchmen were an instrumental surf rock band based in Dayton, Ohio, during the late 1990s. Their style combined the surf guitar influence of Dick Dale or Link Wray, early British punk, and the use of a theremin. They have opened for bands such as  Dick Dale, Man or Astro-man?, Los Straitjackets, and The Breeders.

After the band dissolved, guitarist Nick Kizirnis joined Eyesinweasel, a side project of Tobin Sprout. He recorded a solo album entitled "Into the Loud" and a rockabilly album called "Go Crazy Pop!" on ATOM Records.

Members
Brian Bagdonus - bass (1995)
Brian Hogarth - bass
Nick Kizirnis - guitar, theremin
Gregg Spence - drums

Discography
All The News That's Fit To Surf (7-inch EP - 1996, Luna)
Louder Than Dirt, Thicker Than Mud!  (CD - 1997, Big Beef)
Covered With Mulch (Cassette - 1998, Big Beef)
Greetings from Planet Stupider (CD - 1998, Big Beef)

References

Surf music groups
Musical groups from Dayton, Ohio